The Native American Student and Community Center is part of Portland State University in Portland, Oregon.

References

External links

 

Portland State University